Harstad Tidende (meaning Harstad Times in English) is a daily, regional newspaper published in the city of Harstad, Norway. With a circulation of 13,503, the paper covers the municipalities of Harstad, Bjarkøy, Kvæfjord, Lødingen, Tjeldsund, Evenes, Skånland, Gratangen, Lavangen and Ibestad. The newspaper is owned by Harstad Tidende Gruppen, which is in turn owned by Polaris Media. The paper was edited by Haakon Storøy from 1945 to 1946.

References

External links
Official site

Daily newspapers published in Norway
Companies based in Troms
Mass media in Harstad
Polaris Media